Thurnscoe Victoria Football Club was an English association football club based in Thurnscoe, South Yorkshire.

History

League and cup history

Records 
 Best FA Cup performance: 2nd Qualifying Round, 1930–31, 1933–34

Former players 
1. Players that have played/managed in the Football League or any foreign equivalent to this level (i.e. fully professional league).
2. Players with full international caps.
3. Players that hold a club record or have captained the club.

  Billy Biggar
  Stan Burton
  Steve Griffiths
  George Tepper
  Frank Westlake

References 

Defunct football clubs in South Yorkshire
Defunct football clubs in England
Sheffield Association League